Above Suspicion is a 2019 American crime thriller film directed by Phillip Noyce, from a screenplay by Chris Gerolmo, based upon Joe Sharkey's non-fiction book of the same name revolving around the murder of Susan Smith. It stars Emilia Clarke, Jack Huston, Sophie Lowe, Austin Hébert, Karl Glusman, Chris Mulkey, Omar Miller, Kevin Dunn, Thora Birch and Johnny Knoxville.

It was released in the United States on May 7, 2021, by Lionsgate.

Plot
An ambitious rookie agent is assigned to an FBI field office in the run-down town of Pikeville, Kentucky. The married man recruits a local drug-addicted woman as his informant and gets involved with her, thereby setting in motion a downward spiral of jealousy, betrayal and violence.

Cast 
Emilia Clarke as Susan Smith 
Jack Huston as Mark Putnam
Sophie Lowe as Kathy Putnam
Austin Hébert as Randy McCoy
Thora Birch as Jolene
Johnny Knoxville as Cash
Brian Lee Franklin as Rufus
Luke Spencer Roberts as Bones
Kevin Dunn as Bob Singer
Chris Mulkey as Todd Eason
Omar Benson Miller as Denver Rhodes
Brittany O'Grady as Georgia Beale

Production 

The film was announced during the 2016 Cannes Film Festival. Philip Noyce was set as director, with Emilia Clarke and Jack Huston cast as the film's two main leads. The production began filming in Lexington, Kentucky on May 24, 2016. Omar Benson Miller was cast on May 25, 2016, with May 27 seeing the additions of Thora Birch and Johnny Knoxville to the cast, alongside numerous other supporting actors. Filming took place in central and eastern Kentucky – in Lexington in Fayette County, and in Bourbon and Harlan counties – in 2016.

Release
It was first released in the United Arab Emirates on June 20, 2019. Its theatrical release in the United States and on VOD was on May 7, 2021 by Lionsgate.

Reception

Box office 
Above Suspicion grossed a worldwide total of $25,396.

Critical response 
On Metacritic, the film holds a rating of 46 out of 100, based on nine critics, indicating "mixed or average reviews".

References

External links 
 
 

2019 films
2019 crime thriller films
American crime thriller films
American films based on actual events
Crime films based on actual events
Films based on non-fiction books
Films directed by Phillip Noyce
Films set in the 1980s
Films set in Kentucky
Films shot in Kentucky
Lionsgate films
Thriller films based on actual events
2010s English-language films
2010s American films